This is a list of the main career statistics of former professional Russian tennis player Ekaterina Makarova.

Performance timelines

Only main-draw results in WTA Tour, Grand Slam tournaments, Fed Cup and Olympic Games are included in win–loss records.

Singles

Doubles

Significant finals

Grand Slam finals

Doubles: 7 (3 titles, 4 runner-ups)

Mixed doubles: 2 (1 title, 1 runner-up)

Olympic finals

Doubles: 1 (1–0)

Year-end championships finals

Doubles: 2 (1 title, 1 runner-up)

Premier Mandatory & Premier 5 finals

Doubles: 18 (7 titles, 11 runner-ups)

WTA career finals

Singles: 5 (3 titles, 2 runner-ups)

Doubles: 36 (15 titles, 21 runner-ups)

ITF Circuit finals

Singles: 6 (3 titles, 3 runner–ups)

Doubles: 15 (9 titles, 6 runner–ups)

WTA Tour career earnings

Fed Cup participation 
This table is current through the 2017 Fed Cup

Singles: 10 (6–4)

Doubles: 5 (5–0)

Record against other players

Record against top 10 players 
Makarova's win–loss record against certain players who have been ranked in the top 10. Active players are in boldface:

Top 10 wins

Singles

Doubles
Players that were in the top 10 in that moment are in boldface.

Notes

External links

References

Makarova, Ekaterina